Eshaqabad (also Romanized as Esḩāqābād; also known as Esḩāq and Is-hāq) is a village in Jowzam Rural District, Dehaj District, Shahr-e Babak County, Kerman Province, Iran. At the 2006 census, its population was 48, in 11 families.

References 

Populated places in Shahr-e Babak County